Casanay is a town in the Sucre State, Venezuela. It is the shire town of the Andrés Eloy Blanco Municipality, Sucre.

External links
 Casanay portal

Populated places in Sucre (state)